The Samsung Galaxy Core Prime (also known as the Galaxy Prevail LTE on Boost Mobile) is an Android smartphone designed, developed, and marketed by Samsung Electronics. The Galaxy Core Prime features a  WVGA display, 4G LTE connectivity and Android Kitkat 4.4.4. Some variants can be upgraded to Lollipop 5.0.2 OS  or Lollipop 5.1.1. The 4G version of Samsung Galaxy Core Prime (SM-360FY/DS) was launched on 2 June 2015.

Variants 
In Brazil, Core Prime is marketed under the name Win 2, a model optionally with Digital TV.

The Samsung Galaxy Core Prime Value Edition was released with a Marvell PXA1908.

Specifications

 Single or Dual SIM
 4.5" 480 x 800 TFT display with 207dpi (xdpi: 197, ydpi: 192)
 Ships with Android OS version 4.4.4 KitKat. Available to update to Lollipop OS 5.0.2 or 5.1.1 operating system with "TouchWiz Home" Home screen UI
 Quad-core 1.2 GHz Cortex-A53 processor
 Adreno 306/Mali 400MP GPU
 1 GB of RAM
 Snapdragon 410 chipset/Spreadtrum SC8830
 8 GB built-in storage, microSD card slot (up to 128 GB)
 5 Megapixel camera with LED flash, 720p video recording, 2 megapixelfront-facing camera
 Cat. 4 LTE (150/50Mbit/s); Wi-Fi b/g/n; Bluetooth 4.0; NFC; GPS; microUSB, FM radio
 2,000 mAh battery.

Reception 
PCMag noted the compactness of the phone. TechRadar did not consider it a good contender at the low-end spectrum of the market.

Controversy 
A Samsung Galaxy Core Prime has exploded while a male child was holding it. He was rushed to the hospital after calling 911, and after recovering, suffered from a phobia of mobile phones. This generated some confusion because it was assumed it was a Samsung Galaxy Note 7, infamous for exploding.

See also
 Samsung Galaxy Core
 Samsung Galaxy Star 2 Plus

References

External links 

 Samsung Galaxy Core Prime hardware revisions - postmarketOS

Android (operating system) devices
Samsung mobile phones
Samsung Galaxy
Mobile phones introduced in 2014